Glyphidocera democratica is a moth in the family Autostichidae. It was described by Edward Meyrick in 1929. It is found in North America, where it has been recorded from Alabama, Arkansas, Florida, Kentucky, Louisiana, Mississippi, North Carolina, Tennessee, Texas and West Virginia.

The wingspan is 16–18 mm. The forewings are light ocherous brown, thinly sprinkled with dark fuscous. The stigmata are cloudy, dark fuscous, the first discal spot is moderately large, the plical slightly before it, the second discal slightly transverse or indistinctly double. The apical edge is suffused with fuscous. The hindwings are light gray.

References

Moths described in 1929
Glyphidocerinae